Italy has participated in all editions of the European Athletics Championships, held since the first edition of 1934 European Athletics Championships.

Summary

Italians have won 33 titles in the men's field and 7 in the women's field. The men's marathon is a specialty, with five wins in the men's field (two each for the Olympic champions Gelindo Bordin and Stefano Baldini, plus that of Daniele Meucci) and two in the women's field with Maria Guida and Anna Incerti.

Pietro Mennea and Adolfo Consolini, three times each, are the Blues with the most European titles, while in the women's field Messina Annarita Sidoti, with two victories, holds this record. In Stuttgart 1986 the Italian athletes achieved a historical undertaking by painting the entire podium of blue with Stefano Mei, Alberto Cova and Totò Antibo in the 10,000 meters, a result repeated in the marathon race in Budapest 1998 with Stefano Baldini, Danilo Goffi and Giacomo Modica.

Medal count

 Update to the new medals after doping disqualifications.

Medals awarded years later after doping cases

Medalists

See also
Athletics in Italy
Italy national athletics team
Italy at the World Championships in Athletics
Italy at the European Athletics Indoor Championships

References

External links
 European Athletic Association
 FIDAL - Federazione Italiana Di Atletica Leggera

 
Nations at the European Athletics Championships
Athletics in Italy